Shirerpeton is an extinct genus of albanerpetontid amphibian from the Early Cretaceous Kuwajima Formation, which is located in Japan. The type species is Shirerpeton isajii, which was described by Masumoto & Evans in 2018. Shirerpeton represents the first record of Albanerpetontidae in East Asia and the holotype is SBEI 2459, a small block bearing most of a disarticulated but associated skull with some postcranial elements present as well.

Phylogeny 
From Daza et al (2020):

References

Albanerpetontidae
Fossil taxa described in 2018